The 2018 FIM CEV Moto2 European Championship was the ninth CEV Moto2 season and the fourth under the FIM banner.

Calendar
The following races were scheduled to take place in 2018.

Entry list

Championship standings
Scoring system
Points were awarded to the top fifteen finishers. A rider had to finish the race to earn points.

Riders' championship

Manufacturers' championship

References

External links

 

FIM CEV Moto2 European Championship
2018 in motorcycle sport